Nikić is a South Slavic surname. It may refer to:

Chris Nikic (born 1999), American amateur  triathlete
Goran Nikić (born 1969), Serbian footballer
Miloš Nikić (born 1986), Serbian volleyball player
Nikola Nikić (born 1956), Bosnian football manager
Predrag K. Nikic, Yoga exponent
Slobodan Nikić (born 1983), Serbian water polo player

See also 
 Nikisch
 Nikitsch, Burgenland

Bosnian surnames
Croatian surnames
Serbian surnames
Patronymic surnames
Surnames from given names